Ralph Kubail (30 April 1952 – 15 August 1981) was a German rower who competed for West Germany in the 1976 Summer Olympics.

At the 1974 World Rowing Championships in Lucerne, he won bronze with the coxed four. At the 1975 World Rowing Championships in Nottingham, he won bronze with the coxed four. In 1976 he was a crew member of the West German boat that won the bronze medal in the coxed four event. He died of a lymphoma on 15 August 1981.

References

External links
 

1952 births
1981 deaths
Olympic rowers of West Germany
Rowers at the 1976 Summer Olympics
Olympic bronze medalists for West Germany
Olympic medalists in rowing
West German male rowers
World Rowing Championships medalists for West Germany
Medalists at the 1976 Summer Olympics